China Railway Chengdu Group, officially abbreviated as CR Chengdu or CR-Chengdu, formerly, Chengdu Railway Administration is a subsidiaries company under the jurisdiction of the China Railway (formerly the Ministry of Railway). It is in charge of 9 primary railway routes, with operating length of 4,457.8 kilometers. It oversees the railway networks in Sichuan, Chongqing, Guizhou, although the portion of Nanning-Kunming railway in Guizhou is administered by Kunming Railway Administration. The railway administration was reorganized as a company in November 2017.

Hub stations
 Chengdu
 Chongqing
 Guiyang
 ,

Regional services

C-train services

References

External links
成都铁路局概况 (中华人民共和国铁道部)
成都铁路局运营线路示意图 (中国铁路货运网)

Ministry of Railways of China
Transport in Chengdu
Transport in Sichuan
China Railway Corporation